Douglas Steven Massey (born October 5, 1952 in Olympia, Washington, United States) is an American sociologist. Massey is currently a professor of Sociology at the Princeton School of Public and International Affairs at Princeton University and is an adjunct professor of Sociology at the University of Pennsylvania.  

Massey specializes in the sociology of immigration, and has written on the effect of residential segregation on the black underclass in the United States.
He has been president of the Population Association of America, the American Sociological Association and the American Academy of Political and Social Science. He is a co-editor of the Annual Review of Sociology.

Academia
Massey received his Bachelor of Arts in Sociology, Psychology, and Spanish, from Western Washington University in 1974, and in 1977 he received a Master of Arts in Sociology from Princeton University.  Massey continued at Princeton University and received his PhD in 1978. He was a Guggenheim fellow in 1990–1991. 

Douglas S. Massey is the founder and co-director of the Latin American Migration Project, and the Mexican Migration Project with his long-time collaborator Jorge G. Durand. 
He is Board Member of the Institute for Interdisciplinary Research on Conflict and Violence (Institut für interdisziplinäre Konflikt und Gewaltforschung) at Bielefeld University,  a past editor of the International Journal of Conflict and Violence and a  co-editor of the Annual Review of Sociology.

Massey was president of the Population Association of America in 1996. He served as the 92nd president of the American Sociological Association, 2000–2001, From 2006 to 2015, he was the president of the American Academy of Political and Social Science. In 2008, he received a special recognition from the World Cultural Council.

Massey's research areas include:
demography, urban sociology, race and ethnicity, international migration, and Latin American society, particularly Mexico.
He has won several awards for his works.

Book titles

 2007: Categorically Unequal: The American Stratification System
 Russell Sage; 340 pp. 
 2007: New Faces in New Places: The New Geography of American Immigration (editor)
 Russell Sage; 370 pp. 
 2005: Return of the "L" Word: A Liberal Vision for the New Century
 Princeton; 232 pp. 
 2005: Strangers in a Strange Land: Humans in an Urbanizing World
 W.W. Norton; 352 pp.
 2004: Crossing the border: Research from the Mexican Migration Project (co-edited with Jorge Durand)
 Russell Sage; 345 pp. 
 2001: The Source of the River: The Origins, Aspirations, and Values of Freshmen at America's Elite Colleges and Universities (with Camille Charles, Garvey Lundy, and Mary J. Fischer)
 Princeton; 304 pp. 
 2001: Beyond Smoke and Mirrors: U.S. Immigration Policy in the Age of Globalization (with Jorge Durand and Nolan Malone)
 Russell Sage; 216 pp. 
 2001: Problem of the Century: Racial Stratification in the United States at Century's End (co-edited with Elijah Anderson)
 Russell Sage; 470 pp. 
 1998:  Worlds in Motion: International Migration at the End of the Millennium (with Joaquín Arango, Graeme Hugo, Ali Kouaouci, Adela Pellegrino, and J. Edward Taylor)
 Oxford; 362 pp.
 1993: American Apartheid: Segregation and the Making of the Underclass (with Nancy A. Denton)
 Harvard; 304 pp. 
 1987: Return to Aztlan: The Social Process of International Migration from Western Mexico (with Rafael Alarcón, Jorge Durand, Humberto González)
 University of California; 354 pp.

Journal articles

Notes

External links
Princeton University, Sociology Department
Mexican Migration Project
Latin American Migration Project
Video (and audio) of discussion/interview with Douglas Massey by Will Wilkinson on Bloggingheads.tv

American sociologists
Princeton University faculty
1952 births
Living people
Presidents of the American Sociological Association
Western Washington University alumni
Members of the United States National Academy of Sciences
Princeton University alumni
Fellows of the American Academy of Political and Social Science
Annual Reviews (publisher) editors